Ivonne Chillihua (possibly from Aymara for a species of grass (Festuca dolichophylla)) is a mountain in the Andes of southern Peru, about  high. It is located in the Tacna Region, Tarata Province, Susapaya District. Chillihua lies southwest of the lakes Vilacota and Lake Neque ("mud lake").

References

Mountains of Tacna Region
Mountains of Peru